Boneh-ye Isa (also Romanized as Boneh-ye ‘Īsá and Boneh Isa) is a village in Choghamish Rural District, Choghamish District, Dezful County, Khuzestan Province, Iran. At the 2006 census, its population was 373, in 76 families.

References 

Populated places in Dezful County